Phryma nana is a species of flowering plant in the family Phrymaceae, native to Japan. It was first described by the Japanese botanist Gen-ichi Koidzumi in 1939. Its status as a separate species was not usually accepted, and it was treated as a subspecies or variety of Phryma leptostachya. In 2016, the distinctiveness of the Japanese P. nana was again supported, based on both earlier molecular phylogenetic analysis and morphological analysis. , the species is recognized by Plants of the World Online.

References

Phrymaceae
Flora of Japan
Plants described in 1939